Ciego de Ávila City is a city in the central part of Cuba and the capital of Ciego de Ávila Province. The city has a population of about 497.000, in a municipality of 756,373.

Geography
Ciego de Ávila lies on the Carretera Central highway and on a major railroad. It was part of the Camagüey Province until 1976, when Fidel Castro's government made Ciego de Ávila the capital of the newly created Ciego de Ávila Province.

By 1945, the municipality was divided into the barrios of Angel Castillo, Ceballos, Guanales, Jagüeyal, Jicotea, José Miguel Gómez, Júcaro, La Ceiba, Majagua, Norte, San Nicolás and Sur. After the new political and administrative division of Cuba in 1976, it was divided into four municipalities (Majagua, Ciego de Ávila, Baragua, and Venezuela).

Climate

Ciego de Ávila experiences a tropical savanna climate (Köppen Aw).

History

The city of Ciego de Ávila was founded by 1840, having at the time 263 inhabitants. In 1877, its municipal government was created and the city became independent of the city of Morón. Ciego de Ávila gained importance when the Spanish army built a fortified military line, known as Trocha de Júcaro a Morón, to impede the pass of insurrectionist forces to the western part of the island during the 1st War of Independence (1868–1878). This "trocha", which made this region famous, was thought to be strong enough to stop the Cuban forces, but was not able to stop the pass of General Máximo Gómez and several hundred men. Many of the old Spanish colonial buildings in Ciego de Ávila (such as the Teatro Principal) were commissioned under Angela Hernández, viuda de Jiménez, a rich socialite who battled to create a cultural mecca in her hometown.

Demographics
In 2004, the Municipality of Ciego de Ávila had a population of 135,736.

Attractions
Parque Martí is the largest park in the city of Ciego de Ávila.
Teatro Principal is a 500-seat theatre located just a few blocks from Parque Martí.
University of Ciego de Ávila (Universidad de Ciego de Ávila, UNICA) is the province's secondary education institution.
IPVCE Ignacio Agramonte Instituto Pre-Universitario Vocacional de Ciencias Exactas (10 a 12 grado) con emphasis en las ciencias basicas: Fisica, Quimica, Matematica, Biologia y Electronica. Se encuentra en la carretera a Ceballos.
la Turbina is a small amusement park located to the north west of the city with approximately 6 rides to use.

Media
Its present radio station, Radio Surco (previously Radio Cuba) was founded October 10, 1952.

Sports
Ciego de Ávila's basketball team has been one of the most successful teams in the country as it won 9 national championships since 2005.

Notable residents
Andy Morales (b. 1974, Major League Baseball player
Tony Pérez (b. 1942), Major League Baseball player
Rusney Castillo (b. 1987), Major League Baseball player
William Granda (b. 1985), member of Cuba's national basketball team

See also
Municipalities of Cuba
List of cities in Cuba

References

External links

Ciego de Ávila (fica.inf.cu)

 
Cities in Cuba
Populated places in Ciego de Ávila Province
Populated places established in 1840
1840 establishments in the Spanish West Indies
1840s establishments in Cuba